Church of Santa Maria Assunta may refer to:

Italy
Altamura Cathedral, a cathedral in Altamura, province of Bari, Apulia
Basilica di Santa Maria Assunta, Aquileia, a church in Aquileia, province of Udine, Friuli-Venezia Giulia
Church of Santa Maria Assunta, a church in Castelfranco Emilia, province of Modena, Emilia-Romagna
Church of Santa Maria Assunta (Esine), a church near Esine, province of Brescia, Lombardy
Church of Santa Maria Assunta, Pietrabbondante, province of Isernia, Molise
Cremona Cathedral, a cathedral in Cremona,  province of Cremona, Lombardy
I Gesuiti, Venice, a religious building in Venice, Veneto
Santa Maria Assunta, Genoa, a church in Genoa, Liguria
Santa Maria Assunta, Guardalfiera, a church in Guardialfiera, province of Campobasso, Molise
Siena Cathedral, a cathedral in Siena, province of Siena, Tuscany
Torcello Cathedral, a basilica church on the island of Torcello, Venice, Veneto

France
Lucciana Cathedral, a cathedral in Lucciana, Haute-Corse, Corsica
Saint-Florent Cathedral, a former cathedral in Saint-Florent, Haute-Corse, Corsica